Aspatria Island is an island in Australia. It is located in the state of Queensland, in the eastern part of the country, 1600 km north of the capital, Canberra.

References

Islands of Queensland